Lehtisaari may refer to several places in Finland:

Lehtisaari, Helsinki, neighbourhood in Helsinki
Lehtisaari, Jyväskylä, district and neighborhood in Jyväskylä